Francesco Bernardi, also known as Bigolaro (flourished first half of the 17th century) was an Italian painter of the early Baroque period. A native of Verona, he was a pupil of Domenico Feti and painted historical subjects.

References

17th-century Italian painters
Italian male painters
Painters from Verona
Italian Baroque painters
17th-century births
17th-century deaths
Year of birth unknown
Year of death unknown